Ruth Pearce is an Australian diplomat ambassador in Honiara, Moscow - with accreditation to 12 former Soviet republics - Manila and Warsaw.”

Her years of service were: Ambassador to Poland (2008- 2011), Ambassador to the Philippines (2002-05), Ambassador to the Russian Federation (1999-2002) and as High Commissioner to the Solomon Islands (1992-94).

When she was Ambassador to Russia in 1999, she was one of six female ambassadors out of almost 170 ambassadors. When she was ambassador to the Philippines, she had to stay in a hotel during renovations to the Embassy. Due to security concerns, she was driven in an armored car and had round the clock bodyguards.  Despite the security, “the hotel was taken hostage” during a coup attempt and parts of the area immediately surrounding the hotel had been booby trapped with explosives.  Pearce was safely escorted from the building.

Pearce graduated from the University of Melbourne with a Bachelor of Arts degree and a Bachelor of Laws degree with Honours.

References

Ambassadors of Australia to Poland
Ambassadors of Australia to Russia
Ambassadors of Australia to the Philippines
Ambassadors of Australia to Ukraine
High Commissioners of Australia to the Solomon Islands
University of Melbourne alumni
Australian women ambassadors
Year of birth missing (living people)
Living people